St. Brendan's College (sometimes shortened to SBC) is an independent Catholic secondary day and boarding school for boys, located in Yeppoon, Queensland, Australia. The school was founded by the Congregation of Christian Brothers in 1940 and opened with a total of 59 students. The school describes itself as "Australia's Largest Country Boys Boarding School", and has educated several leading National Rugby League players.

History
Groundbreaking for the school started on 8 October 1939 and presided by Romuald Denis Hayes, Bishop of Rockhampton. The school officially opened in February 1940 with 42 boarders and 17 day students. The first headmaster of St Brendan's was Brother Basil Gettons.

The school's spiritual and academic policies are rooted in the traditions of Edmund Ignatius Rice and the school is a member of Edmund Rice Education Australia. The school is named after Saint Brendan the Navigator.

St Ursula's College, Yeppoon, a separate Catholic all-girls day and boarding school located further into the centre of Yeppoon, has shared a close relationship with St Brendan's. Both schools share a relationship with a Catholic primary school in Yeppoon, Sacred Heart.

The college song, Bordered by blue waters splendid, details the rural surrounds of the school near Mary's Mount, as well as confirming strength in faith-based learning.

House system
St. Brendan's College has four houses:

Headmasters
The Rector of St. Brendan's College has been a Christian Brother from the foundation of the college until the appointment of Simon Dash, the first lay principal, in 2003.

Student demographics and facilities
The school accepts students of all faiths and backgrounds.

The school hosts the largest rodeo of the CRCA circuit. The rodeo is held annually over the Father's Day weekend (the first in September in Australia). The school also holds a cattle club and stud program. The school allows students to bring their own cattle to prepare for shows.

Associations
As one of the 27 Christian Brothers Colleges founded throughout Queensland, St. Brendan's College Old Boy's continue to provide Officials, Coaches and Players to this uniquely Queensland Association of Brothers Old Boys Clubs.

 Confraternity of Brothers Clubs (Rugby League)
 Brothers Rugby Fraternity (Rugby Union)

Notable alumni
Politics, public service and the law

 Bryan Jared KramerMember of Parliament, Papua New Guinea, since 2017
 John MomisPresident of the Autonomous Region of Bougainville, 2010–present

Entertainment, media and the arts
 Gerry Connollycomedian
 Shannon Molloyauthor and journalist

Sport
 Hayden Murray (IT Technician)|]]IT at Urshies 

 Harry Grantrugby league footballer
 Ben Huntrugby league footballer
 PJ Marshrugby league footballer
 Corey Oatesrugby league footballer
 Julian O'Neillrugby league footballer
 Matthew Scottrugby league footballer
 Dave Taylorrugby league footballer

References

External links
 

Catholic boarding schools in Australia
Boarding schools in Queensland
Boys' schools in Queensland
Catholic secondary schools in Queensland
Educational institutions established in 1939
1939 establishments in Australia
Congregation of Christian Brothers secondary schools in Australia